Reed Scott Blankenship (born March 2, 1999) is an American football safety for the Philadelphia Eagles of the National Football League (NFL).

Early life and education
Blankenship was born on March 2, 1999, and grew up in Athens, Alabama. He attended West Limestone High School and played football and basketball. He was an all-state, all-region, all-county and all-area selection in football and earned the Player of the Year award in 2016. He served as the team's captain in two seasons and finished his career with 3,192 rushing yards, 1,004 yards receiving, 1,056 yards passing and 46 total touchdowns.

After graduating from high school, Blankenship received scholarship offers from Middle Tennessee, Alabama A&M, Marist, Minnesota, Southern Miss, Georgia State, Tulane, Troy, Samford, Arkansas State, Western Carolina, Arkansas Tech, Mercer, UT Martin, and Central Arkansas.

Blankenship accepted the offer from Middle Tennessee and played in 13 games, nine as a starter, in his true freshman season (2017). He placed fourth on the team with 68 tackles and also made a sack and two interceptions, earning honorable mention all-conference and C-USA All-Fresman honors.

As a sophomore in 2018, Blankenship appeared in 13 games and started 12, making a team-leading and career-high 107 tackles along with four interceptions and seven passes defended. His four interceptions ranked 16th in the nation. Against Old Dominion on October 27, he made a sack, 17 tackles, 3 for loss and returned an interception 100 yards for a touchdown, earning the Bronko Nagurski National Defensive Player of the Week award and conference defensive player of the week honors. His interception return ranked number two on ESPN's top plays of the day list. At the end of the season, Blankenship was named first-team all-conference.

As a junior in 2019, Blankenship played in seven games before suffering a season-ending leg injury. A team captain, he compiled 58 tackles (fourth place on the team), two interceptions, three passes defended and a forced fumble before the injury. He also blocked two kicks, placing him first in the nation. Despite missing half the season, Blankenship was named second-team all-conference at the end of the year.

In 2020, Blankenship appeared in and started all nine games and made a team-leading 76 tackles. He was part of the Bednarik Award and Jim Thorpe Award watchlists. He was projected a mid-round pick for the 2021 NFL Draft, but he decided to return for one more season at Middle Tennessee.

In 2021, as a fifth-year senior, Blankenship started all 13 games and was the school's leading tackler with 110 stops. He made three fumble recoveries which ranked third in the nation, and also placed eighth nationally in solo tackles per game with 5.8. He played 1,030 snaps which was more than any other player on the team. Against Marshall, Blankenship returned a fumble 90 yards for a touchdown and made a forced fumble, two recoveries and seven stops, being named the conference defensive player of the week for his efforts. Against Charlotte, he made 13 tackles and set the all-time Middle Tennessee tackles record. He was named a candidate for the Senior CLASS Award on October 6. At the end of the year, he was named first-team all-conference, C-USA all-academic, the conference Spirit Service Award winner, the Middle Tennessee Defensive Ironman of the Year and a selection to the East–West Shrine Bowl.

Professional career

After going unselected in the 2022 NFL Draft, Blankenship was signed by the Philadelphia Eagles as an undrafted free agent. He was one of three 2022 undrafted players to make the Eagles' final roster, along with Josh Sills and Josh Jobe. He made his NFL debut in week five against the Arizona Cardinals, recording two tackles in the 20–17 win. After being mostly a special teams player, Blankenship saw his first significant playing time on defense against the Green Bay Packers in week twelve, after subbing in for the injured C. J. Gardner-Johnson. In the game, he made his first career interception, off of Aaron Rodgers, and led the team in tackles with six.

References

External links
 Philadelphia Eagles bio
 Middle Tennessee Blue Raiders bio

1999 births
Living people
American football safeties
Players of American football from Alabama
People from Athens, Alabama
Middle Tennessee Blue Raiders football players
Philadelphia Eagles players